Aken may refer to:
Aken (god), in Ancient Egyptian religion
Aken (Elbe), a town in Saxony-Anhalt, Germany
Aachen, a city in Germany
Aken (novel), a 1996 novel by Madis Kõiv